Labeobarbus osseensis is a species of cyprinid fish which is endemic to Lake Tana in Ethiopia.

References 

Cyprinid fish of Africa
Fish of Lake Tana
Endemic fauna of Ethiopia
osseensis
Fish described in 2000